Shaun Malcolm Cole (born 19 November 1963) is a British cosmologist and academic. He has been Professor of Physics at Durham University since 2005 and is the current director of the Institute for Computational Cosmology. He was joint-winner of the 2014 Shaw Prize.

References

1963 births
Living people
British astrophysicists
Academics of Durham University
20th-century British astronomers